Ernst-August Köstring (20 June 1876 – 20 November 1953) was a German diplomat and officer who served during World War II.

Life
Born in Imperial Russia in 1876, Ernst August Köstring grew up in St Petersburg (or Moscow) and was fluent in Russian. He left Russia just before the World War I as many other Germans. He took part in World War I and served under Major General Hans von Seeckt in the Austro-Hungarian Seventh Army. After the war, he was retained in the Reichsheer. From 1919, he was back in the Prussian War Ministry and then detached to the Ministry of the Reichswehr in 1919 the latter was established.

On 1 August 1935, he was returned to active service as a military attaché to Russia and Lithuania and sent back to Moscow. During the invasion of Poland, as a German military attaché in Moscow Köstring played a key role in co-ordination between Nazi Germany and Soviet Union. In September 1939 he was involved in the Molotov–Ribbentrop Pact negotiations, along with Colonel Heinrich Aschenbrenner. On 8 August 1940, Köstring was warned by General Franz Halder that "he would have to answer a lot of questions soon", which made him one of a few people who knew of the invasion of the Soviet Union despite the non-aggression pact. With the planned Operation Barbarossa, his position in Moscow was untenable; he was repatriated under diplomatic immunity and assigned to the Führerreserve. He visited, together with Friedrich Werner von Schulenburg, prisoner-of-war camps to recruit Soviet prisoners-of-war for the German war effort. On 1 May 1941, German military delegation, headed by Köstring, attended the Soviet military parade in Moscow in honour of International Workers' Day.

On 1 September 1942, when he was appointed "General Officer attached to Army Group A for Caucasian Questions" under General Eduard Wagner. In that role, he worked on creating national legions among the indigenous people of the Caucasus, among them the Muslim Karachai. He arranged for Armenians, Georgians and other Caucasian populations to fight at the front after training in Poland. Most of the Armenians deserted.

The Karachai had formed an anti-Soviet committee under Qadi Bayramukov(ru) before the Germans arrived. Köstring invited them to the Bairam feast on 11 October. He was exceptionally well received and was carried shoulder-high in celebration, as was the custom.

In the spring of 1943 Köstring put into the Führerreserve. In mid-June 1943, he was appointed Inspector of the German commanded Turkic associations. On 1 January 1944, he was appointed the General of the "volunteer" organizations in the Army High Command. Throughout that period, he spent most of his time helping with the creation of Andrey Vlasov's Russian Liberation Army.

He surrendered on 4 May 1945 to the U.S. Army and he was released in 1947. He co-authored the 1946 book The Peoples of the Soviet Union, which was later used by the U.S. Army.

References

Sources 
 Mitcham, Samuel W. (2009) Men of Barbarossa: Commanders of the German Invasion of Russia 1941. Casemate.

1876 births
1953 deaths
People from Serebryano-Prudsky District
People from Venyovsky Uyezd
German Army generals of World War II
Generals of Cavalry (Wehrmacht)
Major generals of the Reichswehr
German military attachés
German Army personnel of World War I